Hans Heinz Theyer (August 5, 1910 – October 18, 1961) was an Austrian cinematographer. He worked on around forty films, including The Emperor Waltz (1953).

Selected filmography
 Gulliver's Travels (1924)
 Flowers from Nice (1936)
 No Sin on the Alpine Pastures (1950)
 Wedding in the Hay (1951)
 The Mine Foreman (1952)
 Ideal Woman Sought (1952)
 The Emperor Waltz (1953)
 Roses from the South (1954)
 Marriage Sanitarium (1955)
 Espionage (1955)
 Emperor's Ball (1956)
 Deutsche Wochenschau (1945) *
 Love, Girls and Soldiers (1958)
 When the Bells Sound Clearly (1959)
 No Kissing Under Water (1962)

References

Bibliography
 Fritsche, Maria. Homemade Men in Postwar Austrian Cinema: Nationhood, Genre and Masculinity. Berghahn Books, 2013.

External links

1910 births
1961 deaths
Austrian cinematographers
Film people from Vienna